Zaragoza metro station is a station of the Mexico City Metro in Venustiano Carranza, Mexico City. It is an underground station with two side platforms served by Line 1 (the Pink Line) between Gómez Farías and Pantitlán stations. It serves the colonias (neighborhoods) of 4 Árboles and Puebla. It lies below the Calzada Ignacio Zaragoza from which it receives its name, which in turn is named after Ignacio Zaragoza, the Secretary of War and Navy during the Battle of Puebla (internationally known as Cinco de Mayo). The station's pictogram features a silhouette of the nearby equestrian statue that honors him.

Zaragoza station opened on 4 September 1969 with service westward toward Chapultepec station; service eastward toward Pantitlán started on 22 August 1984. The facilities are accessible for people with disabilities as there are elevators, tactile pavings, access ramps, and braille signage plates; inside there is a cultural display, an Internet café, and a health module. In 2019, the station had an average daily ridership of 46,475 passengers, making it the 18th busiest station in the network and the 6th busiest of the line. Since 11 July 2022, the station has remained closed due to modernization works on the tunnel and the line's technical equipment.

Location

Zaragoza is a metro station located along Calzada Ignacio Zaragoza, in Venustiano Carranza, Mexico City. The station serves the colonias (Mexican Spanish for "neighborhoods") of 4 Árboles and Puebla. Within the system, the station lies between Gómez Farías and Pantitlán stations. The area is serviced by a Centro de transferencia modal (CETRAM), a type of transport hub and by Routes 162B, 163, 163A, 163B, 164, 166, and 167 of the Red de Transporte de Pasajeros network.

Exits
There are two exits:
North: Calzada Ignacio Zaragoza and the entrance of the Regional Bus Station (CETRAM), 4 Árboles.
South: Calzada Ignacio Zaragoza and 65 Street, Puebla.

History and construction
Line 1 of the Mexico City Metro was built by Ingeniería de Sistemas de Transportes Metropolitano, Electrometro, and Cometro, the last one a subsidiary of Empresas ICA. Its first section opened on 4 September 1969, operating from Zaragoza towards Chapultepec station. When it was opened, Zaragoza station served as the terminal of Line 1, thus the workshops are found after the station. On 22 August 1984, Pantitlán station was opened to connect Lines 1 and 5. The location of the workshop indirectly benefited the operations on the line as it allows the trains to depart to either station every 90 seconds.

The station was named after Ignacio Zaragoza, who was the Secretary of War and Navy during the Battle of Puebla, internationally celebrated as Cinco de Mayo. The station's pictogram features a silhouette of the equestrian statue of Zaragoza located in the zone. It has a disabled-accessible service as there are elevators, access ramps, tactile pavings and braille signage plates, a cultural display, an Internet café, and a health module. The station will be closed in 2022 for modernization work on the tunnel and technical equipment of the line.

Landmarks
The Instituto de Capacitacion y Desarrollo Zaragoza is near the station. The system's personnel is capacitated there with full-sized replicas and props of the facilities and their equipment. Otherwise known as Expometro, it can be visited by the general public with guided tours.

Ridership
According to the data provided by the authorities since the 2000s, commuters have averaged per year between 29,800 and 61,300 daily entrances in the last decade. In 2019, before the impact of the COVID-19 pandemic on public transport, the station's ridership totaled 15,572,745 passengers, which was a decrease of 1,390,692 passengers compared to 2018. In the same year, Zaragoza was the 18th busiest station of the system's 195 stations, and it was the line's 6th busiest.

Gallery

Notes

References

External links

1969 establishments in Mexico
Accessible Mexico City Metro stations
Mexico City Metro Line 1 stations
Mexico City Metro stations in Venustiano Carranza, Mexico City
Railway stations located underground in Mexico
Railway stations opened in 1969